Mírová (until 1955 Mnichov) is a municipality and village in Karlovy Vary District in the Karlovy Vary Region of the Czech Republic. It has about 300 inhabitants.

References

Villages in Karlovy Vary District